Shelah Mae Robiso Cadag is a Filipino footballer who plays as a forward for the University of Santo Tomas football team.

Career
Shelah Mae Cadag plays for the women's football team of the University of Santo Tomas (UST) which plays in the University Athletic Association of the Philippines (UAAP) and the PFF Women's League.

In UAAP Season 80, Cadag helped UST secure a place in the women's football final by scoring a brace in her collegiate team's second match against the De La Salle University which ended in a 5–2 win for UST. The UAAP Season 80 women's football final was contested by the same two teams with De La Salle winning 2–1 over UST. Cadag scored the sole goal for UST and was named the Best Striker for the season.

International career
Cadag made her first appearance for the Philippines women's national football team in the first round of the 2020 AFC Women's Olympic Qualifying Tournament held in November 2018. The Philippines won 9–0 over Singapore on their first match in the qualifiers on November 4, 2018, where Cadag managed to score a hat-trick. Cadag repeated the same feat in the Philippines' 5–1 win over Mongolia on November 11.

International goals 
Scores and results list the Philippines' goal tally first.

References

University of Santo Tomas alumni
University Athletic Association of the Philippines footballers
Philippines women's international footballers
Living people
Filipino women's footballers
Women's association football forwards
Competitors at the 2019 Southeast Asian Games
1998 births
Southeast Asian Games competitors for the Philippines